Mersin İdmanyurdu (also Mersin İdman Yurdu, Mersin İY, or MİY) Sports Club; located in Mersin, east Mediterranean coast of Turkey in 2005–06. The team participated in Second League Category A for 4th time in the league's 5th season. Mersin İdmanyurdu football team has finished 2005–06 season in 16th place in Turkish Second League Category A. Team participated in 2005–06 Turkish Cup, and eliminated after group stage.

Hasan Ahi was club president at the start of the season. Erol Ertan was elected president in the mid-season. MİY started to season with Levent Arıkdoğan as the head coach. Then Engin Korukır and Nasır Belci took the position within the season. Serkan Merç and Birand Yataş had the most appearances, with 36 each. Ferdi Yanık was the season top goalscorer with 9 goals.

2005–06 TFF First League participation
Mersin idmanyurdu participated in 2005–06 Second League Category A (the league has been played under the name of "Second League Category A" between 2001–02 and 2005–06; "TFF League A" in 2006–07; and "TFF First League" since 2007–08. Also sponsor names have been included in various seasons.). 18 teams attended in the league. Winners and runners-up were directly promoted to 2006–07 Süper Lig. The teams placed 3rd through 6th in the normal season played promotion play-offs to determine third team to be promoted. Bottom three teams were relegated to 2006–07 TFF Second League.

Mersin idmanyurdu participated in 2005–06 Second League Category A and finished 16th meaning that the team was relegated to 2006–07 Second League Category B, the third tier, for the second time in its history.

Results summary
Mersin İdmanyurdu (MİY) 2005–06 Second League Category A season league summary:

Sources: 2005–06 TFF First League pages.

League table
Mersin İdmanyurdu (MİY) 2005–06 Second League Category A season place in league table.

Results by round
Results of games MİY played in 2005–06 Second League Category A by rounds:

First half
Mersin İdmanyurdu (MİY) 2005–06 Second League Category A season first half game reports is shown in the following table.
Kick off times are in EET and EEST.

Sources: 2005–06 TFF First League pages.

Second half
Mersin İdmanyurdu (MİY) 2005–06 Second League Category A season second half game reports is shown in the following table.
Kick off times are in EET and EEST.

Sources: 2005–06 TFF First League pages.

2005–06 Turkish Cup participation
2005–06 Turkish Cup was played for 44th time as Fortis Türkiye Kupası for sponsorship purposes. The Cup was played with 54 teams in three stages. In the first stage two qualification rounds were played in one-leg elimination system. In the second stage (group stage) 20 teams played in four groups, 5 teams in each, in a one-leg round-robin system. Top two teams in each group played in knock-out stage. Beşiktaş won the cup for the 6th time. MİY played in qualification stage and was eliminated in fşrst round.

Cup track
The drawings and results Mersin İdmanyurdu (MİY) followed in 2005–06 Turkish Cup are shown in the following table.

Note: In the above table 'Score' shows For and Against goals whether the match played at home or not.

Game details
Mersin İdmanyurdu (MİY) 2005–06 Turkish Cup game reports is shown in the following table.
Kick off times are in EET and EEST.

Source: 2005–06 Turkish Cup pages.

Management

Club management
Hasan Ahi was club president at the start of the season. Erol Ertan, building contractor and deputy mayor of Mersin was elected president in the mid-season.

Coaching team
MİY started the season with Levent Arıkdoğan as the head coach. After 10th round he left. Assistant coaches Ahmet Lülü (goalkeeper trainer) and Yusuf Ömür managed the team during interim period. Before 13th round Engin Korukır signed. He was replaced by Nasır Belci before 25th round.

2004–05 Mersin İdmanyurdu head coaches

Note: Only official games were included.

2005–06 squad
Appearances, goals and cards count for 2005–06 Second League Category A  and 2005–06 Turkish Cup games. 18 players appeared in each game roster, three to be replaced. Only the players who appeared in game rosters were included and listed in order of appearance.

Sources: TFF club page and maçkolik team page.

See also
 Football in Turkey
 2005–06 TFF First League
 2005–06 Turkish Cup

Notes and references

2005-06
Turkish football clubs 2005–06 season